Dennis Rivera could refer to:

Dennis Rivera (labor official) (born 1950), American labor official
Dennis Rivera (wrestler), American professional wrestler